Lebanon State Airport  is a public airport located one mile (1.6 km) west of Lebanon in Linn County, Oregon, United States.

External links
 City of Lebanon Transportation website
 Airport Layout Plan

Airports in Linn County, Oregon
Lebanon, Oregon